Ben Bartch (born July 22, 1998) is an American football guard for the Jacksonville Jaguars of the National Football League (NFL). He played college football at Saint John's (MN).

Early life and high school
Bartch grew up in McMinnville, Oregon and attended Blanchet Catholic School where he played tight end. He was not recruited out of high school.

College career
Bartch began his collegiate career playing tight end. He played in one game as a freshman and was the team's third tight end as a sophomore, catching four passes for 43 yards and one touchdown. His coaches liked his blocking ability and suggested he move to the offensive line going into his junior season. In order to gain weight, Bartch consumed a protein shake daily consisting of 7 scrambled eggs, tub of cottage cheese, quick grits, peanut butter, bananas and gatorade and went up from 250 pounds to 275 by summer training camp before eventually reaching 305 pounds. Bartch became the Johnnies starting left tackle and was named second-team All-Minnesota Intercollegiate Athletic Conference (MIAC) and to the Allstate AFCA Good Works Team at the end of the season. As a senior, Bartch was named first-team All-MIAC and a consensus first-team All-American by D3Football.com. Considered a prospect in the 2020 NFL Draft, Bartch was invited to participate in the 2020 Senior Bowl.

Bartch also competed on Saint John's track and field team in shot put and discus throw events.

Professional career

Bartch was selected in the fourth round of the 2020 NFL Draft by the Jacksonville Jaguars. He became the first Saint John's player to be drafted since 1974 and the first player to be drafted from any Division III program since the Tampa Bay Buccaneers selected Ali Marpet in 2015. Bartch made his NFL debut on September 13, 2020 in the season opener against the Indianapolis Colts, playing five snaps on special teams. He was placed on the reserve/COVID-19 list by the Jaguars on December 15, 2020, and activated on January 5, 2021.

Bartch entered the 2022 season as the Jaguars starting left guard. He suffered a dislocated knee in Week 5 and was placed on injured reserve on October 11, 2022.

References

External links 
 Saint John's Johnnies bio

1998 births
American football offensive tackles
Jacksonville Jaguars players
Living people
Players of American football from Oregon
Saint John's Johnnies football players
Sportspeople from McMinnville, Oregon